Saint-Félix-Lauragais (Languedocien: Sant Felitz de Lauragués) is a commune in the Haute-Garonne department in southwestern France.

History
The village was previously called Saint-Félix-de-Caraman or Carmaing. In 1167 the Cathars held a Council here, attended by many local figures and also by the Bogomil papa Nicetas, the Cathar bishop of (northern) France and a leader of the Cathars of Lombardy.

Geography

Climate

Saint-Félix-Lauragais has a oceanic climate (Köppen climate classification Cfb) closely bordering on a humid subtropical climate (Cfa).

Population

Sights
The Château de Saint-Félix-Lauragais is a 12th-century castle which is listed as a historical site by the French Ministry of Culture.

See also
Communes of the Haute-Garonne department

References

External links

 Saint-Félix-Lauragais at revel-lauragais.com (in French)

Communes of Haute-Garonne